Tamar is a village in Lafur Rural District, North Savadkuh County, Mazandaran Province, Iran. At the 2006 census, its population was 74, in 24 families.

References 

Populated places in Savadkuh County